Cedratine is a distilled beverage (liqueur) produced from citrus fruits with an alcohol percentage between 36 and 40 percent. 

It originated in Tunisia, where most of it is still produced. It is also popular in Corsica.

Cedratine can be consumed straight at room temperature or cold, or serve as the basis for many cocktails and for fruit salad.

See also

 List of lemon dishes and beverages
 Limoncello

References

Distilled drinks
Tunisian cuisine
Tunisian culture
Citrus liqueurs
Lemon drinks